Heterosternuta pulchra is a species of predaceous diving beetle in the family Dytiscidae. It is found in North America.

References

 D.J. Larson, Y. Alarie, and R.E. Roughley. (2001). Predaceous Diving Beetles (Coleoptera: Dytiscidae) of the Nearctic Region, with emphasis on the fauna of Canada and Alaska. NRC 43253.
 Nilsson, Anders N. (2007). "Some necessary corrections of the spelling of species-group names within the family Dytiscidae (Coleoptera)".

Further reading

 Arnett, R. H. Jr., and M. C. Thomas. (eds.). (21 December 2000) American Beetles, Volume I: Archostemata, Myxophaga, Adephaga, Polyphaga: Staphyliniformia. CRC Press LLC, Boca Raton, Florida. 
 
 Richard E. White. (1983). Peterson Field Guides: Beetles. Houghton Mifflin Company.

Dytiscidae
Beetles described in 1855